Amina Srarfi (أمينة الصرارفي), (born 1958 in Tunis), is the first woman chef d'orchestre in Tunisia.

Life

Early life 
She started in music when she was small; her father Kaddour Srarfi was a violinist, conductor and composer of classical Arab music. She graduated in Arabic music in 1979, later holder of the first prize for violin and a general university degree in musicology. She also took conducting courses in Paris. Srarfi made her professional debut in teaching for ten years. Then in 1988, she decided to create and direct the first private music school to whom she gives her father's name: the Conservatoire Kaddour Srarfi of music and dance.

Singing 
She was a member since 1982 of the Tunisian Symphony Orchestra; she directed the children's choir of the Tunisian television shows and in the production of radio programs (RTCI). In 1984, during the Festival of the Medina, she was voted best singer for heritage preservation. A year later, the appeared as a singer the Carthage International Festival under the baton of Abdelhamid Ben Aljia and sang at the Olympia in Paris.

Chef d'orchestre 
In 1992, she created the first female orchestra of classical music "El'Azifet", and directed herself, which is a first in the Arab music scene. She works with her husband, Fayçal Karoui, artistic advisor of the troop and versatile composer who, through his writing and his new vision of music, using classical Arabic to update the directory and create a directory to its own orchestra. She conducted the orchestra around the world: Paris, Madrid, London, Cairo, Washington, New York, Stockholm, Hanover, Vienna, Algiers, Istanbul, Beijing or Seoul. 
She also frequents festivals such as Carthage, Hammamet or Jerash.

In 1997 she was elected president of the "music" commission in the International Council of Women. The same year, she organized in Tunis in collaboration with the National Union of Tunisian Women a show entitled "Women in Music in the Mediterranean", which brought together fourteen orchestras from all over the Mediterranean basin and most of which are made for occasion.

Awards 
She was decorated in 1993 as an officer, and in 2001, as a Commander of Cultural Merit. At the National Women's Day, August 13, 2001, she was decorated officer under the Republic. In 2008, on the occasion of the day of the culture, she was made a Grand Officer.

References

External links
https://www.123rf.com/photo_26517121_manama-bahrain--october-04-amina-srarfi-with-her-all-female-orchestra-el-azifet-performs-on-october-.html

 

Tunisian conductors (music)
1958 births
Tunisian women
Living people
Women conductors (music)
Women violinists
21st-century conductors (music)
21st-century women musicians
21st-century violinists